Papapana is an Austronesian language of Bougainville, Papua New Guinea.

References

Further reading

External links 
 ELAR archive of Papapana language documentation materials

Northwest Solomonic languages
Definitely endangered languages
Languages of Papua New Guinea
Languages of the Autonomous Region of Bougainville